Asafia school, located near Malakpet in Hyderabad, was built in 1895 by Afsar ud Dowla, during the Nizam regime. A well-known architect of the Nizam period, Abdul Karim Babu Khan, worked on this building. The school was inaugurated by Kishan Parsad, Deputy Minister of Hyderabad state. The building was abandoned in 1963 and the school shifted to a new location.

References 
 Asafia school building in neglect, Times of India 25 Oct 2003

Schools in Hyderabad, India
Educational institutions established in 1895
1895 establishments in India
Schools in the princely states of India
 Heritage structures in Hyderabad, India